Wendy Jane Walker (born 1964, Manchester, Lancashire) is an actress who became well known during the 1980s for playing Susan Barlow in the ITV soap opera, Coronation Street.

She originally played the part as a child from 1970 to 1974, and after another actress portrayed the character in intervening years, she returned in 1985 as a regular character. Walker stayed in the role until late 1987.

Other acting roles included The Adventures of Sherlock Holmes, Brass and six episodes of How We Used to Live in 1984. By 1990, Walker had retired from acting and was working as a tour operator.

References

External links
 

English soap opera actresses
1964 births
Living people
20th-century English actresses
21st-century English actresses
Actresses from Manchester